Geoffrey de Mandeville (died c. 1100), also known as de Magnaville (from the Latin de Magna Villa "of the great town"), was a Constable of the Tower of London. Mandeville was a Norman, from one of several places that were known as Magna Villa in the Duchy of Normandy. These included the modern communes of Manneville-la-Goupil and Mannevillette. Some records indicate that Geoffrey de Mandeville was from Thil-Manneville, in Seine-Maritime, Haute-Normandy (upper Normandy).

Life

An important Domesday tenant-in-chief, de Mandeville was one of the ten richest magnates of the reign of William the Conqueror. William granted him large estates, primarily in Essex, but in ten other shires as well. He served as the first sheriff of London and Middlesex, and perhaps also in Essex, and in Hertfordshire. He was the progenitor of the de Mandeville Earls of Essex. About 1085 he and Lescelina, his second wife, founded Hurley Priory as a cell of Westminster Abbey.

Family

He married firstly, Athelaise (Adeliza) (d. bef. 1085), by whom he had:

 William de Mandeville (d. bef. 1130), married Margaret dau. of Eudo, dapifer, who m. 2ndly Otuer fitz Count.
 Beatrice de Mandeville, m. Godfrey de Bouillon, natural son of Eustace II, Count of Boulogne. Geoffrey was Lord of Carshalton, Surrey
 Walter, who was also one of his tenants in 1086.

He married secondly Lescelina, by whom he had no children.

References

Additional references
 Ancestral Roots of Certain American Colonists Who Came to America Before 1700 by Frederick Lewis Weis, Line 158A-23.

1100 deaths
11th-century births
Year of birth unknown
Year of death uncertain
Anglo-Normans
People from Essex
High Sheriffs of Middlesex
G